Rafał Kazimierz Trzaskowski (born 17 January 1972) is a Polish politician and the current city mayor of Warsaw. He is also a political scientist specializing in European studies.

He served as a Member of the European Parliament (2009–2013), Minister of Administration and Digitization (2013–2014) as well as the Secretary of State in the Ministry of Foreign Affairs of the Republic of Poland (2014–2015). He was elected a Member of the Polish Parliament in 2015. In November 2017, it was announced that he would be the joint candidate for the Mayor of Warsaw of the Civic Platform and the Modern political party in the 2018 Polish local elections. He subsequently went on to win the elections on 21 October 2018 in the first round and was elected Mayor of Warsaw after defeating his major rival Patryk Jaki of the Law and Justice party. He received a total of 505,187 votes (56.67%).

In May 2020, Trzaskowski became the Civic Platform's candidate for Presidency of Poland to stand in the presidential election. He made it into the second round of the election but then went on to lose against incumbent Andrzej Duda, receiving 10,018,263 votes or 48.97% of the vote.

Early life and education
Rafał Kazimierz Trzaskowski was born on 17 January 1972 in Warsaw, the son of Polish jazz composer Andrzej Trzaskowski and Teresa née Arens. His half-brother Piotr Ferster was the director of the Piwnica pod Baranami cabaret in Kraków. His great-grandfather, was a linguist who established some of the first girls' secondary schools (gimnazja) in Poland. As an 8-year-old, he appeared on "Our Backyard" (Polish: Nasze podwórko), a 1980 Polish children's television series, and had a promising career as an actor.

Trzaskowski attended  and Cranbrook-Kingswood High School in Bloomfield Hills, Michigan, U.S.A. (1990-1991), then studied international relations and English philology at the University of Warsaw, graduating in 1996. He subsequently graduated in European studies from the College of Europe in Natolin (1997). He was granted a scholarship at the Oxford University in 1996 as well as the European Union Institute for Security Studies in Paris in 2002. In 2004, he obtained his Doctor of Philosophy (Ph.D.) degree in political science at the University of Warsaw's Faculty of Journalism and Political Science, after completing a dissertation titled "The dynamics of the European Union's institutional reform" under the supervision of Stanisław Parzymies.

Since 1995, he worked as a simultaneous interpreter and an English teacher. In 1998, he became an academic teacher at the National School of Public Administration, and in 2002 at the Collegium Civitas. His scientific interests primarily concern the European integration and international affairs. Since 2002, he has also worked as an analyst at the European Centre in Natolin.

Political career
Between 2000 and 2001, he started working for Jacek Saryusz-Wolski at Poland's Office of the European Integration Committee. In the years 2004–2009, he was an advisor of the Civic Platform political party at the European Parliament. In 2009, having received 25,178 votes, he was elected Member of the European Parliament representing the Platforma Obywatelska party. During his election campaign he was supported by well-known Polish personalities and artists such as Tomasz Karolak, Grzegorz Turnau, Michał Żebrowski and Urszula Dudziak. At the European Parliament, he was a member of the European People's Party. In 2010, he was the head of the election campaign of Hanna Gronkiewicz-Waltz running for the post of the mayor of Warsaw in the 2010 Polish local elections.

On 27 November 2013, Trzaskowski was sworn in as the Minister of Administration and Digitization by President Bronisław Komorowski. During his ministry, Trzaskowski created a system of notifying the Government Security Center warning citizens, about violent meteorological phenomena. He was responsible for cooperation with local governments, supervision over voivodes and assistance to victims in connection with natural disasters, for example during the floods in 2014, as well as cybersecurity, accessibility of content on the Internet for people with disabilities and protection of personal data on the web. On 24 September 2014, he became Deputy Minister of Foreign Affairs of the Republic of Poland and dealt with co-ordinating matters relating to the EU across the different ministries of the Donald Tusk cabinet. At that time, Trzaskowski was the main negotiator in relations with the EU on behalf of the prime minister and coordinated the work of ministries in relations with EU institutions.

In 2015, he participated in the 2015 Polish parliamentary elections and won a seat in the Sejm having received 47,080 votes. In 2016, he became a National Council Member of the Civic Platform party. In the same year, he assumed the post of Minister of Foreign Affairs in the shadow cabinet created by the Civic Platform. On 29 March 2017, he became the vice-chairman of the European People's Party. As a Member of the Sejm, Trzaskowski was a member of the European Union Affairs Committee, Foreign Affairs Committee and the Digitization, Innovation and Modern Technologies Committee. In parliamentary activities, Trzaskowski mainly dealt with issues related to foreign affairs, European policy, defence, as well as health policy, protection of civil and minority rights, and self-government support. During his time, he submitted over 150 interpellations and over 70 parliamentary questions.
In 2017, he received the order of the Legion of Honour for his contributions to strengthening the Polish-French relations.

In February 2020, he was elected as Civic Platform's vice-chairman.

Mayor of Warsaw

In November 2017, it was announced that he would be the joint candidate for the Mayor of Warsaw of the Civic Platform and the Modern political party in the 2018 Polish local elections. He subsequently went on to win the elections on 21 October 2018 in the first round and was elected Mayor of Warsaw after beating his major rival Patryk Jaki of the Law and Justice party. He received a total of 505,187 votes (56.67%). During his mayoral term, Trzaskowski introduced, among others, a free nursery program for Warsaw kids, increased funding under the Warsaw in vitro program and carried out record purchases of clean public transport vehicles. In the first years of his term in office, six new stations of the second metro line were commissioned and works on the construction of the third metro line were started.

Along with the mayors of the capitals of the other Visegrád Group countries, Trzaskowski signed the Pact of Free Cities in December 2019 to promote "common values of freedom, human dignity, democracy, equality, rule of law, social justice, tolerance and cultural diversity". In August 2020, the mayors released a joint statement, which expressed solidarity with the protesters in Belarus and condemned the violence used by the state authorities. It also appealed to the European Union "to review its policy towards Belarus and introduce measures against those responsible for the violent crackdown".

LGBT Declaration
On 18 February 2019, Trzaskowski signed a 12-point LGBT Declaration and announced his intention to follow World Health Organization guidelines. This declaration aimed at fighting discrimination of the LGBT community and provides guidance in such areas as security, education, culture, sport, administration, and work. Proposed actions range from providing shelter to LGBT teenagers rejected by their families, the introduction of local crisis intervention helplines, and providing access to anti-discrimination and sex education at city schools. Politicians from the national conservative Law and Justice (PiS) party objected to the program saying it would sexualize children. PiS party leader and former Prime Minister Jarosław Kaczyński responded to the declaration, calling LGBT rights "an import" that threatens Poland. According to The Daily Telegraph, the declaration "enraged and galvanized" conservative politicians and conservative media in Poland. The "LGBT-free zone" declarations have been seen as a reaction to the Warsaw declaration. In June 2019, the newly appointed Minister of National Education, Dariusz Piontkowski, criticised the declaration, saying that it was "an attempt to sexualize children by force" and "raise children who will be given away to paedophiles at some point".

2020 presidential election
On 15 May 2020, he was chosen by the Civic Platform party leader Borys Budka to be their candidate for Presidency of Poland to stand in the presidential election, after Małgorzata Kidawa-Błońska's resignation from her candidacy. On 28 June 2020, he earned second place in the first round of the 2020 Polish presidential election, winning 30.46% of the votes, and advanced to the second round, which took place on 12 July 2020. In the second round of voting, Trzaskowski won 48.97% of the votes, losing the election to the incumbent Andrzej Duda, who won 51.03% of the votes.

Wspólna Polska movement
On 17 October 2020, Trzaskowski inaugurated what he termed as "a social and civic movement" named "Wspólna Polska". A part of it, called "New Solidarity", was to be a trade union for the self-employed and those working on term contracts. Around 11,000 members registered within days of the announcement. As of March 2022, the movement's website mentioned around 19,300 registered members and carried no updates since May 2021.

Other activities
 European Council on Foreign Relations (ECFR), Member of the Council
 New Pact for Europe, Member of the Advisory Group

Personal life
He is married to Małgorzata, a graduate of Kraków University of Economics. They have two children: Aleksandra (born 2004) and Stanisław (born 2009).

The Polish right-wing to far-right weekly newspaper Gazeta Polska published an article describing the alleged collaboration of Trzaskowski's mother with the Communist secret police. Teresa Trzaskowska is said to have been an informant operating under the pseudonym of "Justyna" and reported about US diplomats and Polish musicians, especially jazz musicians. She was also said to have spied on Jerzy Matuszkiewicz and Leopold Tyrmand. These allegations were widely publicised by Trzaskowski's opponents during the 2020 Polish presidential race. Trzaskowski never confirmed or denied them.

Publications
Dynamika reformy systemu podejmowania decyzji w Unii Europejskiej, Wydawnictwo Prawo i Praktyka Gospodarcza, Warsaw 2004
Polityczne podstawy rozszerzenia UE, Wydawnictwo Natolin, Warsaw 1997
Przyszły Traktat konstytucyjny. Granice kompromisu w dziedzinie podejmowania decyzji większością kwalifikowaną (co-written with Jan Barcz), Wydawnictwo Prawo i Praktyka Gospodarcza, Warsaw 2004

References

|-

1972 births
Living people
Mayors of Warsaw
21st-century Polish politicians
Civic Platform politicians
University of Warsaw alumni
College of Europe alumni
Recipients of the Legion of Honour
Civic Platform MEPs
MEPs for Poland 2014–2019
Candidates in the 2020 Polish presidential election
Academic staff of Collegium Civitas